Natália Milanová (née Gálisová; born 12 June 1982 in Bratislava) is a Slovak politician, who has served as the Minister of Culture in the Government of Slovakia since 2020. She was appointed by Prime Minister Igor Matovič after the 2020 election.

Since 2014 she has worked for the OĽaNO movement. In the 2016 parliamentary elections, she ran on the OĽaNO candidate list from twelfth place. She was not elected as a Member of Parliament with 1,737 votes (0.6%), but was elected as a substitute from 22nd place. She took the oath of office on 30 January 2018.

In September 2022 she received the Order of Princess Olga, 3rd class from the President of Ukraine Volodymyr Zelenskyy for her support of Ukrainian sovereignty and territorial integrity, in particular by sheltering Ukrainian artists and art objects during the Russo-Ukrainian War and sanctioning Russian propaganda outlets.

References

External links 
 Official website
 Biography webpage at the website of the National Council

Living people
1982 births
21st-century Slovak women politicians
21st-century Slovak politicians
Culture ministers of Slovakia
Women government ministers of Slovakia
Slovak educators
Slovak women educators
Members of the National Council (Slovakia) 2016-2020
Slovak schoolteachers
Comenius University alumni
Recipients of the Order of Princess Olga, 3rd class
Politicians from Bratislava
Female members of the National Council (Slovakia)